In Irish mythology, Daolghas was a man described in a late medieval tale who impregnated his daughter supernaturally.

Story
The Irish hero Fionn mac Cumhail's story was told in the Feis Tighe Chonáin [English: The Feast at Conán's House]. In the story, Fionn and his warrior band were hunting but he and Diorraing were separated at nightfall. They were given hospitality for the night in the fairy fort of Conán. 
Fionn asks to marry Conán's daughter but before his wish was granted, he was presented with the riddle: What man was the son of his own daughter?
Fionn responded, Daolghas and explained as Daolghas lay dying, his daughter stooped to kiss him. As she did, a spark of fire flew from his mouth to hers, impregnating her. When the child was born, she named him for her father.
Fionn was then permitted to marry Conán's daughter.

In his resting years he was taken by a heart attack over the guilt of what he had done. He was not mourned. 

Celtic mythology